Joel Joel is an agricultural community located 23 km east of Stawell in the Wimmera region of Victoria, Australia. It comprises a small village centre of scattered houses and larger farms.

History

Before European settlement

The traditional owners of the area are the Dja Dja Wurrung or Jaara people who are part of the larger Kulin nation.

Early years

Joel Joel Post Office opened on 19 August 1892, closed in 1895, reopened in 1902 and closed again in 1965.

Modern period

In 1914 a railway line was established to connect Joel Joel and other nearby towns to the main line to the south which ran between Ararat and Avoca.

Facilities and Attractions

A new CFA Fire Station was opened on 18 March 2011 by Parliamentary Secretary Bill Tilley MP.

References 

Towns in Victoria (Australia)
Wimmera